Stuart Mark Milburn (born 29 September 1972) is a former English first-class cricketer, who played six first-class matches for Yorkshire County Cricket Club between 1992 and 1995, and twenty one games for Hampshire in 1996 and 1997.

Milburn was born in Harrogate, Yorkshire.  A right arm fast medium bowler, he took 53 wickets in his 27 first-class games at 47.11, with a best of 4 for 38 for Hampshire against Sussex.  He scored 292 runs at 13.27, with a top score of 54 not out for Hampshire against the Indian tourists. In nineteen one day matches he took 15 wickets at 44.73, with a best of 2 for 7 for Hampshire against Ireland, and scored 54 runs at 7.71, with a top score of 27 for Hampshire against Essex.

Milburn latterly played cricket for the Nidderdale League first division outfit, Killinghall C.C.

References

External links
Cricinfo Profile

1972 births
Living people
Yorkshire cricketers
Hampshire cricketers
Cricketers from Harrogate
English cricketers
English cricketers of 1969 to 2000